Morley North is an electoral ward of Leeds City Council in south west Leeds, West Yorkshire, covering Churwell to the north of Morley town and villages of Drighlington and Gildersome.

Boundaries 
The Morley North ward includes the civil parishes of:
Drighlington
Gildersome
Morley (north western section including Churwell, part of Morley Town Council)

Councillors 

 indicates seat up for re-election.
 indicates seat up for election following resignation or death of sitting councillor.
 indicates councillor defection.
* indicates incumbent councillor.

Elections since 2010

May 2022

May 2021

May 2019

May 2018

May 2016

May 2015

May 2014

May 2012

May 2011

May 2010

Notes

References

Places in Leeds
Wards of Leeds